Georgia–Hong Kong relations are bilateral relations between Georgia and Hong Kong.

Georgia and Hong Kong bilateral relations could be traced back to 1991 when Georgia became independent from the Soviet Union and established diplomatic relations with the United Kingdom. Hong Kong, by then a dependent territory of the United Kingdom, followed the British in diplomacy and immediately recognized the independence of Georgia as well as established relations with the nation. The friendly relations have continued even after the United Kingdom withdrew from Hong Kong in 1997.

Free Trade Agreements were negotiated between the two on May 9, 2016. The agreements with Georgia cover, among others, several key elements, including (a) elimination or reduction of tariffs, (b) liberalisation of non-tariff barriers, (c) flexible disciplines on rules of origin which would facilitate bilateral trade, (d) customs facilitation procedures, (e) liberalisation as well as promotion and protection of investment;
(f) liberalisation of trade in services, and (g) the legal and institutional arrangement and dispute settlement mechanism for the FTA. The Government spokesman of Hong Kong suggested that Georgia was an emerging market and that the Free Trade Agreements will help expand Hong Kong's Free Trade Agreements network into the respective regions including Eurasia.

Both nations coexist in several international organizations. The relations between the two focus on economic, social and cultural aspects because Hong Kong is restricted by Hong Kong Basic Law from concluding military bilateral agreements with foreign countries.

See also 
 Foreign relations of Georgia 
 Foreign relations of Hong Kong
 China–Georgia relations

References

Bilateral relations of Hong Kong
Hong Kong